Nguyễn Thị Thanh An (born 17 June 1976) is a Vietnamese woman grandmaster in chess.

She has qualified for the Women's World Chess Championship 2015 through a zonal tournament, losing to Antoaneta Stefanova in the first round.

She previously competed in the 2000, 2004 and 2008 world championships. 

With the Vietnamese national women's team she took part in Chess Olympiads: 2000 in Istanbul, 2002 in Bled, 2004 in Calvia, 2006 in Turin, 2010 in Khanty-Mansiysk, 2016 in Baku.

In 2007 and 2011 she participated in the World Team Chess Championship.

References

External links
 
 
 Thi Thanh An Nguyen chess games entry
 

1976 births
Living people
Vietnamese chess players
Chess woman grandmasters
Asian Games medalists in chess
Asian Games bronze medalists for Vietnam
Chess players at the 2006 Asian Games
Chess players at the 2010 Asian Games
Medalists at the 2010 Asian Games
Southeast Asian Games medalists in chess
Southeast Asian Games gold medalists for Vietnam
Competitors at the 2005 Southeast Asian Games
Competitors at the 2011 Southeast Asian Games